Robert L. Esche (born January 22, 1978) is an American former professional ice hockey goaltender who is the current president of the Utica Comets of the American Hockey League (AHL) and the Utica City FC of the Major Arena Soccer League (MASL). He previously played eight seasons in the National Hockey League (NHL) for the Phoenix Coyotes and Philadelphia Flyers.

Playing career
Esche started his career with the Phoenix Coyotes, only to be traded to the Philadelphia Flyers in a deal involving Michal Handzuš and Brian Boucher. In 2004, he claimed the starting goaltending spot for the Flyers, and led them to the Eastern Conference Finals, only to fall in seven games to the eventual Stanley Cup champion Tampa Bay Lightning.

While playing in Russia for Ak Bars Kazan, he posted a record of 22–5–2 with a 2.01 goals against average (GAA) and a .912 save percentage, along with four shutouts.

Esche skated with Dinamo Minsk during the 2010–11 KHL season. In 2008–09, he posted a record of 21–14 with a 1.87 GAA and .912 save percentage, as well as nine shutouts.

On June 16, 2011, the SCL Tigers announced they had signed the 33-year-old Esche to a contract, where he played 40 games, going 15-25, with a 3.05 GAA and .898 save percentage.

International play
Esche has represented the United States in the 1997 and 1998 World Junior Ice Hockey Championships and the IIHF World Championships in 2000, shutting out Russia in Russia, an accomplishment he still lists as his greatest moment in hockey. He represented the US team in 2001 and also received the starting nod at the 2004 World Cup of Hockey.

Esche was named to the 2006 US Men's Olympic Hockey Team in Turin. He played one game in the Olympic tournament, losing 5–4 to Russia.

Esche played for the 2008 Team USA Hockey team in the World Championships which took place in Canada. He had earned some starts after sitting out the first few games, including a 42 save performance in a controversial 3–2 loss against Finland.  He also posted a 9–1 victory against Norway.

Personal
Esche has two children with his former wife Kelly. 

Esche is nicknamed "Chico" after former NHL goaltender Chico Resch because his sticks were labeled R. Esche.

Awards and accomplishments
1997–98: Second All-Star Team (OHL)
1998–99: All-Rookie Team (AHL)
2002–03: William M. Jennings Trophy shared with Roman Čechmánek, PHI and Martin Brodeur, NJ (NHL)
2002–03: Yanick Dupre Memorial (Philadelphia Flyers)
2003–04: Pelle Lindbergh Memorial (Philadelphia Flyers)
2008 World Championships: Best save percentage (.931)
2008–09: Played in KHL All-Star Game

Career statistics

Regular season and playoffs

International

References

External links
 
 Robert Esche biography at hockeygoalies.org - advanced statistics and game logs

1978 births
Ak Bars Kazan players
American men's ice hockey goaltenders
Detroit Whalers players
American expatriate ice hockey players in Russia
HC Dinamo Minsk players
Houston Aeros (1994–2013) players
Ice hockey players from New York (state)
Ice hockey players at the 2006 Winter Olympics
Living people
Olympic ice hockey players of the United States
Sportspeople from Utica, New York
Philadelphia Flyers players
Arizona Coyotes draft picks
Phoenix Coyotes players
Plymouth Whalers players
SCL Tigers players
SKA Saint Petersburg players
Springfield Falcons players
William M. Jennings Trophy winners
People from Whitesboro, New York
American expatriate ice hockey players in Switzerland
American expatriate ice hockey players in Canada
American expatriate ice hockey players in Belarus